The JR Central Towers are in Nakamura-ku in the city of Nagoya, central Japan. It is located right above Nagoya Station and serves as the headquarters of the Central Japan Railway Company. Built in 2000, it is the second-tallest building in Nagoya, and eighth-tallest overall in Japan as of 2015. It is one of the world's largest train station complex by floor area.

The office tower is slightly taller than the hotel tower.

Takashimaya and the Nagoya Marriott Associa Hotel are in the towers.

See also
List of tallest buildings in Nagoya
List of tallest buildings in the world

External links 

 Homepage of JR Central Towers

Skyscrapers in Nagoya
Kohn Pedersen Fox buildings
Twin towers
Skyscraper office buildings in Japan
Skyscraper hotels in Japan

Office buildings completed in 2000